The Prison For Women ("P4W"), located in Kingston, Ontario, was a Correctional Service of Canada prison for women that functioned at a maximum security level from 1934 to 2000.

Background
The first female inmates arrived on January 24, 1934. Before this date, maximum security female offenders were housed in the Female Department of the maximum security Kingston Penitentiary located across the street.

Beginning in 1995, female inmates were gradually transferred to other federal correctional institutions. On May 8, 2000, the last female inmate was transferred away from the P4W.

In January 2008, Queen's University took ownership of the former site of the Prison for Women. The university archives were originally slated to be housed there once renovations were completed, but this is no longer the case. The transformation of the property included the demolition of three of the four stone security walls.

The institution, and several women who were incarcerated there, were profiled in Janis Cole and Holly Dale's 1981 documentary film P4W: Prison for Women.

Controversy
The Prison for Women was closed following a number of controversial incidents. LSD was administered to inmates at the prison as part of tests that are today considered to be ethically dubious. As well, a riot at the prison in 1994 resulted in Justice Louise Arbour, then of the Ontario Court of Appeal heading up what became known as the Commission of Inquiry into Certain Events at the Prison for Women in Kingston which found that the treatment of prisoners at the facility had been "cruel, inhumane and degrading".
Routinely overclassified in their security category, Indigenous inmates constituted a considerable proportion of the inmate population and reported particularly violent treatment by prison staff.

Directors
 1934–1944 Ms. Edith A. Robinson, Supervising Matron
 1944–1950 Miss Amelia May Gibson, Supervising Matron
 1950–1960 Miss Lorraine L. Burke, Supervising Matron
 1960–1966 Miss Isabel J. McNeill, Superintendent
 1966–1970 Mr. Donald Clarke, Warden
 1970–1972 Mr. C.A.M. Edwards, Warden
 1972–1980 Mr. Doug Chinnery, Warden
 1980–1987 Mr. George Caron, Warden
 1987–1994 Ms. Mary Cassidy, Warden
 1994–2000 Ms. Thérèse LeBlanc, Warden

Notable prisoners
 Karla Homolka – Transferred to Joliette Institution after P4W closed.
 Ann Hansen – Canadian anarchist and former member of Squamish Five.

References

Correctional Service of Canada institutions
Defunct prisons in Ontario
Buildings and structures in Kingston, Ontario
1934 establishments in Ontario
Women's prisons in Canada
2000 disestablishments in Ontario
Women in Ontario